Tragico convegno is an Italian silent movie with colour tinting by director Ivo Illuminati produced in 1915. The story is a melodrama set in an Italian aristocratic environment. The film was considered lost. However, in 2013 Tragico convegno was discovered at EYE Film Institute Netherlands (although the third reel remained missing) and was subsequently presented at the Festival del Cinema Ritrovato in Bologna.

Plot
Lucien has an affair with the married Baroness Fulvia and receives a letter from a friend (dated 18 May 1914) asking him to lodge his daughter Maria. Lucien prepares a children's room, but Maria turns out to be a young lady of eighteen years old. The next day Maria wants to make a tour on horseback and behaves like a cow-girl. Gradually she falls in love with Lucien and tries to wins him over like an adult woman. (This plot summary is based on the incomplete copy.)

Cast
 Angelo Gallina as Lucien Danglar
 Ivo Illuminati as Baron Abruzzio
 Maria Jacobini as Maria Pansa
 Fulvia Perini as ?
 Anna Perini as Baroness Fulvia Abruzzio

References

External links
 

1910s Italian-language films
1915 films
Italian silent short films
Films set in the 1910s
Films set in Italy
Films shot in Italy
Italian drama films
1910s rediscovered films
Italian black-and-white films
Rediscovered Italian films
Silent drama films